Arthur Gelb (February 3, 1924 – May 20, 2014) was an American editor, author and executive and was the managing editor of The New York Times from 1986 to 1989.

Career
Gelb began working the night shift at The Times as a copy boy in 1944. He ascended through the ranks, holding several titles in many different departments.  His biggest impacts were while working in the drama department.  He enjoyed the plays of Eugene O'Neill so much that he wrote a biography of the playwright (O'Neill: Life with Monte Cristo, 1974) with his wife Barbara. He supported the creation of the New York Shakespeare Festival by editorializing Joseph Papp's productions. He has edited a number of works such as "Great Lives of the Twentieth Century". Gelb retired from The Times in 1989 as managing editor.  "City room", a memoir of his life and career at The Times, was published in 2003.

After retiring from The Times, Gelb became president of The New York Times Company Foundation, which operated until 2009, and director of The New York Times College Scholarship Program.

Personal life
Gelb and his family lived in New York City.  Arthur and Barbara Gelb were the parents of Peter Gelb, General Manager of the Metropolitan Opera in New York City.

Death
Gelb died on May 20, 2014, at his home in Manhattan, New York, of complications of a stroke. He was 90.

References

External links

 Gelb Papers at the Harry Ransom Center

1924 births
2014 deaths
People from Manhattan
American newspaper editors
American people of Ukrainian-Jewish descent
Jewish American journalists
Journalists from New York City
The New York Times editors
The New York Times writers
21st-century American Jews